Star+ (stylized as ST★R+) is a Latin American over-the-top subscription video streaming service available in Latin America. The service is owned by the Walt Disney Company through Disney Entertainment.

The service features television and film content from the libraries of Disney subsidiaries, including Star Originals, 20th Television, 20th Television Animation, Searchlight Television, 20th Century Studios, 20th Century Animation (films only), ABC Signature, Freeform, FX Networks, Hollywood Pictures, Hotstar, Hulu, National Geographic, Searchlight Pictures, Touchstone Pictures and many more, as well as live sports from ESPN.

History

Pre-launch
The "Star" brand originated as a Hong Kong-based satellite broadcaster, which operated under that name as an acronym of "Satellite Television Asian Region", it was founded by Hutchison Whampoa in 1991, and had been acquired by News Corporation in 1993. After 2009, the Star brand was mainly restricted to the now separately owned Star China Media, as well as Star India, which operates primarily in India but also distributes Indian vernacular TV programming worldwide and the remaining Asia Pacific rebranded from Star to then Fox International Channels' regional unit. Star India (as well as all of the now Fox Networks Group's Asia Pacific operations) was then acquired by Walt Disney as part of its acquisition of 21st Century Fox on March 20, 2019.

During an earnings call on August 5, 2020, Disney CEO Bob Chapek announced that Disney planned to launch a new international, general entertainment service under the "Star" brand name in 2021. The plan superseded a previously announced international expansion of the majority-controlled American streaming service, Hulu, which has only expanded outside the United States to Japan. Chapek argued that the Hulu brand is not well known outside of the US, while Star being a much more recognizable brand outside of the United States.

Dispute with Lionsgate
In April 2021, Disney faced a trademark dispute in Brazil, Argentina and Mexico with Lionsgate's Starz Entertainment over the use of the Star brand in Latin America. The Wrap reported that Disney had five days to respond to the Brazil lawsuit. As a result, on May 13, 2021, it would be announced that the launch of Star+ in Latin America would be delayed to August 31.

While Disney eventually won the dispute, in July, they would lose an appeal in court in Brazil to the name dispute with Lionsgate. In August 2021, Disney and Starz reached a settlement over the brand name issue allowing Star+ to launch in Latin America on August 31 as scheduled. The lawsuit was dropped after the deal was reached.

In June 2022, Disney and Lionsgate announced a streaming bundle offer in select Latin American countries, consisting of Disney+, Star+ and Lionsgate's Starzplay service.

On September 28, 2022, Lionsgate announced that its Starzplay service will rename to Lionsgate+ worldwide on the next day, including Latin America but excluding United States and Canada (where it will still be known as Starz in these regions), completely ending the name conflict with Disney's Star+ service.

Content 
Star+ serves the same purpose as the Star content hub that was integrated into the Disney+ service in several other countries on February 23, 2021. The services hosts a variety of content from Disney's studios, primarily general entertainment content carried on Disney+, as well as live sports from ESPN.

Original programming 

In addition to acquired content, Star+ will produce original, local content in Latin America to be exclusively released on the platform.

Sports rights

American football 
 National Football League
 College football
 XFL

Association football 
 Africa
 FIFA World Cup qualification (CAF)
 CAF Champions League
 Africa Cup of Nations

Asia
 FIFA World Cup qualification (AFC)
 AFC Champions League
 AFC Cup

 Europe
 UEFA Champions League (except Mexico and Brazil)
 UEFA Europa League 
 UEFA Europa Conference League
 UEFA Super Cup (except Mexico and Brazil)
 UEFA Nations League (except Mexico) 
 UEFA European Qualifiers (except Mexico)

 Belgium
 Belgian First Division A

 England
 Premier League (only South America)
 EFL Championship
 EFL League One 
 EFL League Two 
 FA Cup
 FA Women's Cup
 EFL Cup
 FA Women's Super League 
 FA Community Shield
 FA Women's Community Shield

 France
 Ligue 1
 Trophée des Champions

 Germany
 Bundesliga (only South America)
 2. Bundesliga (only South America)
 DFB-Pokal 
 DFL-Supercup (only South America)

 Italy
 Serie A
 Coppa Italia
 Supercoppa Italiana

 Netherlands
 Eredivisie

 Portugal
 Taça de Portugal
 Taça da Liga

 Scotland
 Scottish Premiership

 Spain
 La Liga (only South America)
 Segunda División (only South America)
 Copa del Rey (only Brazil)
 Copa de la Reina (only Brazil)
 Supercopa de España (only Brazil)
 Supercopa de España Femenina (only Brazil)

 Turkey
 Süper Lig

South America
 Copa Libertadores 
 Copa Sudamericana (only South America)

 Argentina
 Argentine Primera División (except Argentina)
 Supercopa Argentina (except Argentina)

 Brazil
 Copa Nordeste (only Brazil)
 Campeonato Brasileiro Série A (except Brazil)
 Campeonato Brasileiro Série B (except Brazil)

 Ecuador
 Ecuadorian Serie A 

 Peru
 Peruvian Primera División (except Peru)

 Uruguay
 Uruguayan Primera División 

North America
 CONCACAF Champions League (except Mexico)
 CONCACAF League (except Mexico)
 FIFA World Cup qualification (CONCACAF) 

 Mexico
 Liga MX

 United States
 Major League Soccer
 USL Championship 
 USL League One

Australian rules football 
 Australian Football League

Motorsports 
 Formula One (except Mexico and Brazil)
 FIA Formula 2 Championship (except Mexico and Brazil)
 FIA Formula 3 Championship (except Mexico and Brazil)
 Porsche Supercup (except Mexico and Brazil)
 Extreme E
 Dakar Rally
 IndyCar Series
 Indy Lights
 MotoGP
 Superbike World Championship (except Brazil)
 Supersport World Championship (except Brazil)
 Supersport 300 World Championship (except Brazil)
 FIA World Endurance Championship (except Mexico)
 World Rally Championship
 W Series (except Brazil)

Baseball 
 United States                                               
 Major League Baseball
 College baseball

 Mexico
 Mexican League

Basketball 
 United States
 National Basketball Association
 WNBA
 NCAA basketball
 NBA Summer League
 NBA G League
 The Basketball Tournament

 Africa
 Basketball Africa League

 Europe
 Liga ACB
 Copa del Rey de Baloncesto
 Euroleague (Mexico and Central America)

Boxing 
 ESPN Knockout (includes Top Rank, Premier Boxing Champions and Bare Knuckle Fighting Championship)

Combat sport 
 Ultimate Fighting Championship (except Brazil and Mexico)
 Pay-per-view
 Fight Nights
 Dana White's Contender Series
 Bellator MMA (only Brazil)
 Lux Fight League

Cycling 
 Tour de France
 Vuelta a España
 UCI Road World Championships (only South America) 
 Tour Down Under
 Vuelta a San Juan
 Tour Colombia
 Paris–Nice
 Critérium du Dauphiné
 Tour de Romandie (only for South America)
 Tour of Utah (only for South America)
 Cadel Evans Great Ocean Road Race (only for South America) 
 Paris–Roubaix
 Liège–Bastogne–Liège
 Amstel Gold Race
 La Flèche Wallonne
 Clásica de San Sebastián
 Grand Prix Cycliste de Québec (only for South America)
 Grand Prix Cycliste de Montréal (only for South America)

Golf 
 The Masters
 PGA Championship
 U.S. Open
 The Open Championship
 PGA Tour

Hockey 
 National Hockey League
 Svenska Hockeyligan
 Premier Hockey Federation

Polo 
 Campeonato Argentino Abierto de Polo
 Campeonato Abierto de Hurlingham
 Campeonato Abierto del Tortugas Country Club
 U.S. Open Polo

Rugby 
 The Rugby Championship
 Rugby World Cup
 Heineken Champions Cup
 Súper Liga Americana de Rugby

Table Tennis 
 WTT Series

Tennis 
 Australian Open
 French Open
 The Championships, Wimbledon (except Brazil)   
 U.S. Open
 ATP Finals
 ATP Tour Masters 1000
 ATP Cup
 ATP Tour 500
 ATP Tour 250
 WTA Finals
 WTA 1000
 WTA 500
 WTA 250
 Next Generation ATP Finals
 Laver Cup

Volleyball 
 CEV Champions League
 Volleyball Nations League
 Superlega

Device support and service features 
Star+ is available for streaming via web browsers on PC and Mac, as well as apps on iOS and Apple TV, Android and Android TV, Fire TV and Fire HD, Chromecast, WebOS and Tizen OS devices among another digital media player and gaming consoles, such as PlayStation 4, PlayStation 5, Xbox One and Xbox Series X/S, as well as PC running Windows 10 and Windows 11.

Launch

Notes

References

External links 
 

2021 in film
2021 in television
2021 introductions
Internet properties established in 2021
Internet television streaming services
Subscription video on demand services
American companies established in 2021
The Walt Disney Company
Star+